Amblyptilia falcatalis, the common Hebe plume moth, is a species of moth of the family Pterophoridae. This species was first described by Francis Walker and is endemic to New Zealand. This species can be found in both the North and South Islands. The larval host plants are in the Veronica (also known as Hebe) genus and include Veronica stricta, Veronica salicifolia,Veronica elliptica, Veronica macrocarpa and Veronica speciosa. This moth likely has two broods a year and adults have been observed all year round.

Taxonomy 

This species was first described by Francis Walker in 1864 using specimens collected in Nelson by T. R. Oxley. Walker originally named the species Platyptilus falcatalis. In 1875 Cajetan von Felder and Alois Friedrich Rogenhofer, thinking they were describing a new species, named it Platyptilus haasti. John S. Dugdale synonymised this name with P. facatalis in 1988. In 1923, thinking he was describing a new species Alfred Philpott named this species Platyptilia ferruginea. However as this name was preoccupied by Crocydoscelus ferrugineum, Philpott gave the species the new name of Platyptilia indubitata. This later name was synonymised with P. falcatalis in 1928 by George Hudson. Hudson would go on to discuss the larva and pupa of this species in books published in 1939 and 1950. In 1993 Cees Gielis placed this species within the genus Amblyptilia. This placement was followed in 2010 in the New Zealand Inventory of Biodiversity. The lectotype specimen, collected in Nelson, is held at the Natural History Museum, London.

Description 

In 1939 Hudson discussed and illustrated of the larva of this species. He described the larva:
 
He again discussed the larva of this species in 1950 and also illustrated the larva as well as the pupa of this species. Hudson described the specimen upon which he based his 1950 saying that the green subdorsal lines he described in 1939 were replaced by faint, broken reddish coloured lines. Hudson also stated that the larva of A. facatalis had black legs which appeared to be characteristic for this species.

Hudson also described the pupa:

Walker originally described the adult male of the species as follows:

This adult moths are very similar in appearance to A. repletalis. However A. falcatalis has a more rectangular and parallel-edged second lobe of the forewing than P. carduidactyla.

Distribution 

This species is endemic to New Zealand. It is found in both the North and South Islands.

Life history and behaviour 
The larvae are diurnal in their feeding habits. Prior to pupation the larva will retract its head and move the anterior segments of its body in a humping action. The pupa is formed by the larva after it attaches itself to a leaf or twig with a silk pad, hanging head down. The pupa is peculiarly shaped and can come in two colour shades, either a yellowish, green or a darkish brown. Hudson hypothesised that this species has two broods a year. The adults of this species have been observed on the wing all year round but is more commonly seen in late summer and autumn.

Hosts
The larval host plants of this species include Veronica stricta, Veronica salicifolia,Veronica elliptica, Veronica macrocarpa and Veronica speciosa. The larvae of A. falcatalis make mines in leaves of large leaved species of Veronica and also tunnel into centre of the buds of these plants.

Predators 
Research undertaken prior to the introduction of Trigonospila brevifacies into New Zealand as a bio control, indicated that this species of fly uses A. falcatalis as a larval host.

Reference

Amblyptilia
Moths described in 1864
Moths of New Zealand
Endemic fauna of New Zealand
Endemic moths of New Zealand
Taxa named by Francis Walker (entomologist)